Dahll is a Norwegian surname that may refer to
Kygo (born Kyrre Gørvell-Dahll in 1991), Norwegian musician, DJ, songwriter and record producer
Lars Christian Dahll (1823–1908), Norwegian military officer and politician
Olaf Dahll (1889–1968), Norwegian competitive rower
Tellef Dahll (1825–1893), Norwegian mineralogist and geologist
Tellef Dahll Schweigaard (1806–1886), Norwegian politician

See also
Dahl (surname)

Norwegian-language surnames